The Anglo-Jewish Association (AJA) is a British organisation. It was formed in 1871 for the 'promotion of social, moral, and intellectual progress among the Jews; and the obtaining of protection for those who may suffer in consequence of being Jews'. Many Anglo-Jewish businessmen, such as Jacob Behrens, were members.

Former Presidents

Jacob Waley (1871–1873) 
Baron Henry de Worms (1873–1886)
Sir Julian Goldsmid (1886–1895)
Claude Montefiore (1895–1922)
O.E. d'Avigdor Goldsmid (Sir Osmond E. d'Avigdor Goldsmid) (1922–1926)
Leonard G. Montefiore (1926–1939)
Leonard Jacques Stein (1939–1949)
Ewen E.S. Montagu (1949–)
Victor Lucas 
Basil Bard (−1983) 
Clemens N. Nathan (1983–1989) 
Frederick Tuckman (1989–1995)

Other former officers

David Lindo Alexander
Lucien Wolf

See also
 American Jewish Committee
 Alliance Israélite Universelle
 World ORT

References

External links
 Anglo-Jewish Association
 Anglo-Jewish Association at JewishEncyclopedia.com
 Archives of the Anglo-Jewish Association, 1871–1983

Jews and Judaism in the United Kingdom
1871 establishments in the United Kingdom
Organizations established in 1871
Jewish organisations based in the United Kingdom